Alfonso Bernardo de los Ríos y Guzmán, O.SS.T. (1626 – 5 October 1692) was a Roman Catholic prelate who served as Archbishop of Granada (1677–1692), Bishop of Ciudad Rodrigo (1671–1677), and Bishop of Santiago de Cuba (1668–1669).

Biography
Alfonso Bernardo de los Ríos y Guzmán was born in Granada, Spain in 1626 and ordained a priest in the Trinitarian Order.

On 17 September 1668, he was appointed during the papacy of Pope Clement IX as Bishop of Santiago de Cuba.
In 1669, he was consecrated bishop by Antonio Sanz Lozano, Bishop of Cartagena.
On 16 November 1671, he was appointed during the papacy of Pope Clement X as Bishop of Ciudad Rodrigo.
On 13 September 1677, he was appointed during the papacy of Pope Innocent XI as Archbishop of Granada.
He served as Archbishop of Granada until his death on 5 October 1692.

References

External links and additional sources
 (for Chronology of Bishops)  
 (for Chronology of Bishops) 
 (for Chronology of Bishops) 
 (for Chronology of Bishops) 
 (for Chronology of Bishops) 
 (for Chronology of Bishops) 

17th-century Roman Catholic bishops in Cuba
Bishops appointed by Pope Clement IX
Bishops appointed by Pope Clement X
Bishops appointed by Pope Innocent XI
1626 births
1692 deaths
Trinitarian bishops
Archbishops of Granada
Roman Catholic bishops of Santiago de Cuba